Ottomar von Mayenburg (5 December 1865, in Schönheide – 24 July 1932, in Gut Roseneck at Wörthersee) was a German pharmacist. He invented the Clorodont toothpaste for the German market.

Life 
Mayenburg studied botany pharmaceuticals at Leipzig University. After finishing his university studies he worked as a pharmacist in Dresden. In 1907 while in Dresden, he invented a toothpaste, which he named Clorodont. He filled tubes with his new toothpaste and sold it to customers. His new product competed with the Kalodont toothpaste manufactured by Carl Sarg and also the Pebco toothpaste manufactured by Beiersdorf. He was very successful and founded the Leowerke company to sell Clorodont. In the 1920s over 1,000 people worked for the Leowerke company. 
At that time, Von Mayenburg lived with his family in the Eckberg Castle near Dresden.

Film 
 „Die Zahnpasta des Herrn von Mayenburg“. film by Götz Goebel (30 minutes.) for SWR  „Patente & Talente“ (29 December 2007)

Literature 
 Rolf Mahlke: Die Zahnpasta des Herrn von Mayenburg, in: 'Die ZahnarztWoche' (DZW) 51-52/2007 pages 18f

External links 
 History of Chlorodont
  History of Lion-pharmacy in Dresden (since 1560) (PDF; 1,06 MB)

1865 births
1932 deaths
People from Erzgebirgskreis
People from the Kingdom of Saxony
20th-century German inventors